Cox's Bazar (Cox's Bazar Jela also Cox's Bazar Zila) is a district in the Chittagong Division of Bangladesh.
It is named after Cox's Bazar town. Cox's Bazar is also known by the name Panowa ("yellow flower"). Another old name was Palongkee. The modern Cox's Bazar derives its name from Captain Hiram Cox (died 1799), an army officer who served in British India. It is one of the fishing ports of Bangladesh. At Cox's Bazar is one of the world's longest natural sea beaches ( long including mud flats).

Geography
Often termed as the world's longest beach, Cox's Bazar is a major tourist destination within Bangladesh.

It is bounded by Chittagong District on the north, Bay of Bengal in the south, Bandarban District on the east, and the Bay of Bengal on the west. Major rivers include Matamuhuri, Bakkhali, Reju Khal, Naf River, Maheshkhali channel and Kutubdia channel.

History
The history of Cox's Bazar begins in the Mughal period. On his way to Arakan, when the Mughal Prince Shah Shuja (1616–1660) passed through the hilly terrain of the present day Cox's Bazar, he was attracted to the scenic nature of the region. He commanded his forces to camp there. A place named Dulahazara, meaning "one thousand palanquins", still exists in the area.

After the Mughals, the place came under the control of the Tipras and the Arakanese, followed by the Portuguese and then the British.

Cox's Bazar is named after Captain Hiram Cox, an officer of the East India Company, who was assigned with the charges of the current day Cox's Bazar and its adjacent areas. The town of Cox's Bazar was established in 1799 as a market town to honour Captain Cox. In 1854, Cox's Bazar was made a Sub Divisional headquarter in Chittagong district under the Bengal Presidency of British India.

After the end of British rule in 1947, Cox's Bazar remained  a part of East Pakistan under the Dominion of Pakistan till 1971. Captain Advocate Fazlul Karim was the first chairman after independence from the British of Cox's Bazar municipality. He established the Tamarisk Forest along the beach to draw tourism to the town and to protect the beach from the tide. He donated many of his father-in-law's and his own lands to establish a public library and town hall. In 1971, the wharf was used as a naval port by the Pakistan Navy's gunboats. This and the nearby airstrip of the Pakistan Air Force were the scene of intense shelling by the Indian Navy during the Bangladesh Liberation War in 1971.

In the year 1984, Cox's Bazar was upgraded into a District from a Sub Division under the Chittagong Division.

Starting in 2017, a "mass human exodus" of the Rohingya Muslim minority group from neighboring Myanmar's Rakhine State led to the creation, in Cox's Bazar, of the "world's largest refugee settlement" over the following year. In the first year, the UNHCR estimated that 725,000 refugees had sought safety in Bangladesh.

Upazila (Subdivisions)

There are nine upazilas under this district, namely:
Chakaria Upazila
Cox's Bazar Sadar Upazila
Kutubdia Upazila
Maheshkhali Upazila
Ramu Upazila
Teknaf Upazila
Ukhia Upazila
Pekua Upazila
Eidgaon Upazila

Education 
 Cox's Bazar Medical College 
 Cox's Bazar Polytechnic Institute
 Cox's Bazar Govt. College
 Cox's Bazar Govt. Women College
 Cox's Bazar City College
 Cox's Bazar International University
 Cox's Bazar Commerce College
 Cox's Bazar DC College
 Cox's Bazar Harvard College
 Ramu Degree College
 Teknaf College

Climate

The climate remains hot and humid with some seasons of temperate weather.

Demographics

According to the 2011 Bangladesh census, Cox's Bazar district had a population was 2,289,990, of which 1,169,604 were males and 1,120,386 females. Rural population was 1,790,979 (78.21%) while the urban population was 499,011 (21.79%). Cox's Bazar district had a literacy rate of 39.29% for the population 7 years and above: 40.32% for males and 38.22% for females.

93.97% are Muslims, 4.26% Hindus and 1.65% Buddhists. Ethnic population is 14,551. The local dialect is Chittagonian, although there are many Rohingya speakers due to the massive refugee camps.

Economy
The major livelihood of Cox's Bazar district is tourism. Millions of foreign and Bangladeshi natives visit this coastal city every year. A number of hotels, guest houses, and motels have been built in the city and coastal region and the hospitality industry is a major employer in the area.

A number of people are involved in the fishing and collection of seafoods and sea products. Oysters, snails, pearls and jewelry made from shells are popular with the tourists in the seaside and city stores. A number of people are also involved in the transportation business for tourists. Many people of the district are farmers.

In 2002, a surfing club was initiated at Cox's Bazar by a local Bangladeshi. It has now extended to holding an annual competition including locals and foreign tourists. This is the first surfing initiative in Bangladesh's history.

Places of interest

Cox's Bazar, mostly known for its beach and sunsets, has several other attractions, including:
Aggmeda Khyang, a large Buddhist monastery, and a place revered by around 400,000 Buddhist people of Cox's Bazar Hill Tracts.

Birds and terrestrial animals roam near the road.
Inani Beach has interesting rocks and coral boulders.
There are also views of Cox's Bazar city.
It is a tourist spot.
Dulhazra Safari Park, a safari park in Bangladesh which is situated at Chakaria Upazila. It has a range of exotic animals such as birds, snakes,  and water beasts.
 Ukhiya Central Ananda Bhavan Vihar, a renowned Buddhist temple dating from 1782 located at Patabari, Ukhia (3-minute distance from the Arakan highway) 33 km away from the main town of Cox's Bazar.

Notable people
 Obaidullah Hamzah (born 1972), Islamic scholar and economist
 Mohammad Nurul Huda (born 1949), poet and novelist. He was awarded the Ekushey Padak in 2015.
 Aye Thein Rakhaine (born 1962), former MP.
 Shaimum Sarwar Kamal, the elected MP in Cox's Bazar.
 Salimullah Khan, eminent thinker of Bangladesh.
 Mominul Haque, Bangladeshi Cricketer (Now captain of Bangladesh national cricket team in test format).
 Major General Hamidul Haque, Army Officer in Bangladesh Army (Current Rank: Major General).
 Lieutenant Colonel Forkan Ahmed, Retired Army Officer; Now Chairman of Cox's Bazar Development Authority.

Notes

References

External links
Official website
New York Times Travel Article, December 2006

 
Districts of Chittagong Division
Districts of Bangladesh
1984 establishments in Bangladesh
Rohingya-speaking territories